Francisco Jordán (1886 - June 30, 1921) was an Andalusian anarcho-syndicalist. He settled in Barcelona, where he worked as a carpenter and was a member of the National Confederation of Labor (CNT). At the national plenary session on August 24, 1916 he was elected General Secretary, replacing Manuel Andreu Colomer, and held the position until his resignation after being arrested in 1917.

Biography
Born in 1886, as a young man he lived in Pinos Puente, in the province of Granada, where he joined the CNT. He later moved to Barcelona, where in various writings he encouraged disobedience and not going to mass. For these publications he was locked in a punishment cell. In 1911 he was sentenced to four years in prison for being in possession of explosives. In 1916 he was elected Secretary General of the CNT, a position from which he resigned in February of the following year after being arrested for alleged resistance to authority.

He was assassinated on June 30, 1921 in the streets of Barcelona by the gunmen of the Sindicatos Libres.

References

1886 births
1921 deaths
Spanish anarchists
Secretaries General of the Confederación Nacional del Trabajo
Assassinated Spanish politicians
Murdered anarchists